Carla Sofía Carvalho Da Silva is a Venezuelan footballer who plays as a forward. She has been a member of the Venezuela women's national team.

Early life
Carvalho hails from Caracas.

College career
Carvalho attended the West Virginia University Institute of Technology in the United States.

Club career
Carvalho has played for Atlético Venezuela CF.

International career
Carvalho played for Venezuela at senior level in the 2014 Copa América Femenina.

Personal life
Carvalho is of Portuguese descent.

References

Living people
Women's association football forwards
Women's association football midfielders
Venezuelan women's footballers
Footballers from Caracas
Venezuelan people of Portuguese descent
Venezuela women's international footballers
West Virginia University Institute of Technology alumni
Atlético Venezuela C.F. players
Venezuelan expatriate women's footballers
Venezuelan expatriate sportspeople in the United States
Expatriate women's soccer players in the United States
College women's soccer players in the United States
Year of birth missing (living people)